The Clinton Commercial Historic District encompasses the historic commercial center of Clinton, Arkansas.  It encompasses a roughly triangular area, bounded by Main Street, Moss Street, and United States Route 65B, extending northwest along 65B as far as Oak Street.  This area's development began in the mid-19th century, but most of its buildings date from the first half of the 20th century, representing a diversity of architectural styles popular in that time period.  Notable buildings in the district include the Van Buren County Courthouse and the Walter Patterson Filling Station.

The district was listed on the National Register of Historic Places in 2006.

See also
National Register of Historic Places listings in Van Buren County, Arkansas

References

Historic districts on the National Register of Historic Places in Arkansas
Tudor Revival architecture in the United States
National Register of Historic Places in Van Buren County, Arkansas
Bungalow architecture in Arkansas
American Craftsman architecture in Arkansas